The Communist Alliance was registered on 16 March 2009 with the Australian Electoral Commission (AEC) as an Australian political party. It was an alliance of a number of Communist groups, individuals and ethnic-based communist parties. The Alliance was formed to allow communists to run in elections under the Communist banner, while allowing the Communist Party of Australia, a member of the Alliance, to retain a separate, independent membership.

The Alliance endorsed a candidate for the House of Representatives seat of Sydney in the 2010 federal election. The candidate received 0.83% or 656 of the 79,377 votes cast. It also endorsed two candidates for the Senate in New South Wales, receiving 0.17% or 6,999 of the 4,333,267 votes cast.

Communist Alliance changed its AEC registered name to "The Communists" on 24 August 2011, but the AEC deregistered The Communists as a political party on 22 May 2012 because it "failed to prove it still had 500 members eligible for enrolment."

References

External links
The Guardian _ The Worker's Weekly article  on the Election Campaign
The Age - "Alive and red, Communist back from the dead"

2009 establishments in Australia
2012 disestablishments in Australia
Communist parties in Australia
Defunct communist parties
Defunct left-wing political party alliances
Defunct political parties in Australia
Political parties disestablished in 2012
Political parties established in 2009
Political party alliances in Australia